The Dai-ichi was a Go competition.

Outline 
The Dai-ichi ran from 1959 to 1975, although before 1970 only players from the Nihon Ki-in could compete. From 1970 and on, players from all over Japan could compete.
After 1975 it became the Gosei tournament.

Past Winners and Runners-up

Nihon Ki-in Dai-ichi (Nihon Ki-in First Place)

Zen Nihon Dai-ichi (All Japan First Place)

See also
List of professional Go tournaments

Go competitions in Japan